Sagaing Region Hluttaw is the legislature of the Burmese region of Sagaing Region. It is a unicameral body, consisting of 101 members, including 76 elected members and 25 military representatives. As of February 2016, the Hluttaw was led by speaker Than of the National League for Democracy (NLD).

As of the 2015 general election, the National League for Democracy (NLD) won the most contested seats in the legislature, based on the most recent election results.

Election results

2015

Government guarantees, admission and commitment appraisal committee
The Government guarantees, admission and commitment appraisal committee was founded in Sagaing Region Hluttaw by MPs. The chairwoman is Su Myat Htet (Sagaing Township  Constituency No.2 MP) and the secretary is Khin Myo Chit (Kanbalu Township Constituency No.1 MP). The committee was founded by 7 members (MPs).

See also
State and Region Hluttaws
Pyidaungsu Hluttaw

External links
https://www.facebook.com/sagaingregionhluttaw/
https://sagaingregion.hluttaw.mm

References

Unicameral legislatures
Sagaing Region
Legislatures of Burmese states and regions